András Forgács (born 28 August 1985, in Budapest) is a Hungarian football (defender) player who currently plays for Budaörsi SC.

References 
HLSZ 

1985 births
Living people
Footballers from Budapest
Hungarian footballers
Association football defenders
Budapest Honvéd FC players
BFC Siófok players
FC Tatabánya players
Bajai LSE footballers
Balmazújvárosi FC players
Zalaegerszegi TE players
Mosonmagyaróvári TE 1904 footballers
Budaörsi SC footballers
Nemzeti Bajnokság I players
Nemzeti Bajnokság II players